The Feed is a British science fiction drama streaming television series based on Nick Clark Windo's 2018 novel of the same name. The series premiered on 16 September 2019 on Virgin TV Ultra HD in the UK, and all ten episodes were released on 22 November 2019 on Amazon Prime Video.

Premise
The Feed takes place in London in the near future and follows "the British family of Lawrence Hatfield, the man who invented an omnipresent technology called The Feed. Implanted into nearly everyone’s brain, The Feed enables people to share information, emotions and memories, called mundles, instantly. But when things start to go wrong and users become murderous, the family is driven apart as they struggle to control the monster they have unleashed."

Cast and characters
 Michelle Fairley as Meredith Hatfield
 Guy Burnet as Thomas Edward "Tom" Hatfield
 Nina Toussaint-White as Kate Hatfield
 Jeremy Neumark Jones as Ben Hatfield
 Clare-Hope Ashitey as Evelyn "Evie" Kern
 Osy Ikhile as Maxwell Jeremiah "Max" Vaughn
 Shaquille Ali-Yebuah as Danny Morris
 Chris Reilly as Gil Tomine
 Jing Lusi as Miyu Hatfield
 Tanya Moodie as Sue Cole
 David Thewlis as Lawrence Emmanuel Hatfield

Episodes

Production

Development
On 8 February 2018, it was announced that British production companies Liberty Global and All3Media International, together with Amazon Prime Video (as international distributor) had come together to produce a television series adaptation of Nick Clark Windo's novel The Feed. The series is set to be written by Channing Powell who also executive produces alongside Susan Hogg and Stephen Lambert. Each of the directors are credited for two episodes. On 3 May 2018, it was clarified that Powell was credited with the series' creation and that the series order was for a first season consisting of ten episodes.

Casting
On 3 May 2018, it was announced that Guy Burnet, Nina Toussaint-White, David Thewlis, and Michelle Fairley had been cast as series regulars.

Filming
Principal photography for season one was expected to commence in May 2018 in the United Kingdom. "The Feed" filmed scenes in Shrewsbury, England, in December 2018. On 11 January 2019, filming took place in the city centre of Liverpool, England.

Release
The Feed will stream on Amazon Prime Video in the United States, Canada and Latin America, and across Liberty Global’s international platforms, including Virgin Media in the UK.  All3Media International will distribute The Feed elsewhere worldwide, beyond the Amazon and Liberty Global platforms.

References

External links

2019 British television series debuts
2019 British television series endings
2010s British drama television series
2010s British television miniseries
British drama web series
Psychological thriller web series
Thriller web series
Amazon Prime Video original programming
Television series by All3Media
Television series by Amazon Studios
Television shows based on British novels
English-language television shows